Half Moon Street is a street in the City of Westminster, London. The street runs from Curzon Street in the north to Piccadilly in the south.

History
Half Moon Street was built from 1730. It takes its name from a public house that once stood on the corner with Piccadilly.

Notable inhabitants
James Boswell, biographer of Dr Johnson, had lodgings in the street in 1768 at the home of Mr Russell, an upholsterer. Lola Montez, mistress of King Ludwig I of Bavaria, lived in the street in 1849. The street was known for its genteel lodgings and apartments which was still the case when Somerset Maugham visited in 1930.

The WWI poet Siegfried Sassoon also had lodgings in 14 Half Moon Street. 

In the twentieth century, Sax Rohmer (1883-1959) creator of Dr Fu Manchu, once lived in the street. A blue plaque marks the spot.

Buildings
Among the listed buildings in the street are parts of Flemings Mayfair Hotel and Green Park Hotel. Other listed buildings include numbers 6, 7 and 8, 12a, 14, 15, 24, and 25.

In popular culture

Half Moon Street is the setting for the first act of Oscar Wilde's play The Importance of Being Earnest and serves as the character Algernon's home.

Sax Rohmer made repeated use of the street in his work. In other early-20th century fiction, Sapper's hero Bulldog Drummond lived in the street. The street is the London address of the fictional detective Paul Temple and his wife Steve and also frequently appears in the Georgian and Regency novels of Georgette Heyer.

In the 1986 film thriller Half Moon Street, the main character lives in a flat on the street.

61 Half Moon Street is the address of Belinda Blumenthal of Rocky Flintstone's Belinda Blinked series, as mentioned by Cian O'Mahony in 'Footnotes: Understanding The "Timeline"' in Season 6 of the My Dad Wrote a Porno podcast.

In the Aubrey-Maturin novel series by Patrick O'Brian, the fictional physician and spy Stephen Maturin lived on Half Moon Street with his wife Diana Villiers at the start of The Ionian Mission.

References

External links 

Streets in the City of Westminster